Serge Girard is a French ultramarathon runner born in 1953. He fulfilled the challenge of running across the 5 continents without a single day off.

He is related to French hurdler Patricia Girard-Léno.

Runs achieved so far 

 1997: trans-United States (Los Angeles to New York City) - 4,597 km in 52 days, 23 hours, 20 min (former master's world record, beat by Marshall Ulrich; world record holder is Frank Giannino, Jr.)
 1999: trans-Australia (Perth/Sydney) - 3,755 km in 46 days, 23 hours, 12 min (former world record, beat by Achim Heukemes) 2001: trans-South America (Lima/Rio de Janeiro) - 5,235 km in 73 days, 3 hours, 40 min (world record) 2003/2004: trans-Africa (Dakar/Cairo) - 8,295 km in 123 days, 2 hours, 40 min (world record) 2005/2006: trans-Eurasia (Paris/Tokyo-) - 19,097 km in 262 days (probably world only attempt) 2009/2010: one year: 27,011 km in 365 days (world record)''

References

External links 
Run Around the Planet Serge's last challenge website
Serge Girard personal web site

1953 births
French male long-distance runners
French ultramarathon runners
Living people
Male ultramarathon runners